Elizabeth de Mowbray, Duchess of Norfolk (née Lady Elizabeth Fitzalan; 1366 – 8 July 1425) was an English noblewoman and the wife of Thomas Mowbray, 1st Duke of Norfolk.

Through her eldest daughter, Lady Margaret Mowbray, Elizabeth was an ancestress of Queens consort Anne Boleyn and Catherine Howard, and the Howard Dukes of Norfolk. Her other notable descendants include Charles Brandon, 1st Duke of Suffolk; Thomas Stanley, 1st Earl of Derby; Sir Thomas Wyatt, the younger; and Lady Jane Grey (by both parents).

Marriages and children
Lady Elizabeth was born in Derbyshire, England, a daughter of Richard Fitzalan, 4th Earl of Arundel and his first wife Elizabeth de Bohun, daughter of William de Bohun, 1st Earl of Northampton and Elizabeth de Badlesmere.

Elizabeth had five husbands and at least seven children:
 Sir William Montacute, the eldest son of William de Montagu, 2nd Earl of Salisbury (before December 1378).
 Thomas de Mowbray, 1st Duke of Norfolk (1384), married July 1384.
Thomas de Mowbray, 4th Earl of Norfolk (b. 17 September 1385)
Margaret de Mowbray (b. 1388), who married Sir Robert Howard (1385-1436) of Stoke by Nayland in Suffolk, by whom she was the mother of John Howard, 1st Duke of Norfolk.
John de Mowbray, 2nd Duke of Norfolk (b. 1392)
Isabel de Mowbray (b. 1396), married James Berkeley, 1st Baron Berkeley
Elizabeth de Mowbray (b.1398), who married Michael de la Pole, 3rd Earl of Suffolk.
 Sir Robert Goushill or Gousell of Hoveringham, Nottinghamshire (d. 21 July 1403), married before 19 August 1401.
Elizabeth Goushill or Gousell (b. ~1402), wife of Sir Robert Wingfield of Letheringham, Suffolk (1403-1451), they were great-grandparents to Charles Brandon, 1st Duke of Suffolk.
Joan or Jean Goushill or Gousell (b. 1409), wife of Thomas Stanley, 1st Baron Stanley, King of Mann, and parents of Thomas Stanley, 1st Earl of Derby. Through their daughter Katherine, they are ancestors of US President James Madison.
Sir Gerard Usflete, son of Sir Gerard Usflete (d. 1406), MP, married before 3 July 1414.
 Edward Le Despencer, son of Edward Le Despencer (d. 1342) and his wife, Anne de Groby de Ferrers.

She died 8 July 1425 in Wighill, Yorkshire, and was buried with her third husband in St Michael's Church, Hoveringham, Nottinghamshire.

Ancestry

External links
 Assignment of Dower #306, dated 1400.

References

1366 births
1425 deaths
People from Derbyshire
Daughters of British earls
Elizabeth Fitzalan
Date of birth unknown
14th-century English people
14th-century English women
15th-century English people
15th-century English women
Wives of knights